Vapor Transmission is the second album by American Industrial rock band Orgy. It was released on October 10, 2000.

The first 1000 pressings (as well as the Japanese release) of the album included a bonus track known as "The Spectrum", which starts at the 6 minute mark of the last track "Where's Gerrold".
Some packages of this album included an enhanced CD that contained a demo version of the song "Stitches," a remix, and a video for the single "Fiction (Dreams in Digital)". The aforementioned single received significant radio play upon release, reaching number 6 on the Hot Modern Rock Tracks chart. A second single, "Opticon", had more moderate success, and was featured on the soundtrack to the 2001 horror film Valentine. "Suckerface" and "Eva" were also released as promotional singles.

Vapor Transmission largely continues the style heard on Candyass. However, while the electronic effects remain prominent, heavily distorted guitars are slightly de-emphasized with a strong focus on melody.

Track listing

"The Spectrum" was later featured on the compilation album MTV: The Return of the Rock, Vol. 2.
Another song recorded during these sessions was "Sonic", among other demos.

Personnel
Band
Jay Gordon - lead vocals, engineering
Ryan Shuck - guitars, backing vocals
Amir Derakh - keyboards, backing vocals, engineering
Paige Haley - bass, backing vocals
Bobby Hewitt - drums, backing vocals

Additional musicians
Torry Shaun - additional vocals on "Where's Gerrold"
Melanie Cockrum - spoken vocals on "Vapor Transmission (Intro)"
Josh Abraham - additional guitar, additional programming and keyboards on "Fiction (Dreams In Digital)", background vocals, production, engineering
Chris Hager - additional guitar on "Where's Gerrold"
Jimbo Barker - additional guitar on "Chasing Sirens"
Troy Van Leeuwen - additional guitar on "Fiction (Dreams In Digital)" and "Re-Creation"
Anthony Valcic - additional programming and keyboards on "Fiction (Dreams In Digital)", additional programming on "Saving Faces", engineering
Kenny Pierce - additional drums on "The Odyssey"
Toddy Allen - additional drums on "The Odyssey" and "Chasing Sirens"
Judd Kalish - additional programming on "Dramatica"
Elijah Blue Allman - additional vocals on "The Spectrum"

Certifications

References

External links
  (though mislabeled as "Vapor Transmissions")

Orgy (band) albums
2000 albums
Concept albums
Reprise Records albums
Warner Records albums
Albums produced by Josh Abraham
Albums produced by David Kahne